Villar Perosa (Occitan Lhi Vialars; French: Grand-Villars) is a comune (municipality) in the Metropolitan City of Turin in the Italian region Piedmont, located about  southwest of Turin.

Villar Perosa borders the following municipalities: Pinasca, San Pietro Val Lemina, Inverso Pinasca, San Germano Chisone, Porte. Once a predominantly agricultural center, it is now an industrial hub with two SKF plants and one of ZF Sachs.

History

Agnelli family estate
The area is often associated with the Agnelli family of Fiat fame as the family estate is located there. Members of the Agnelli family have lived in the country house since 1811. Marella Agnelli, widow of Gianni Agnelli, lived there.

The family estate has a football pitch which is sometimes used by Juventus for friendlies or training. It hosts an annual intra-squad friendly between the first team and the Primavera.

Twin towns
 Pizzoni, Italy
 Großvillars, part of Oberderdingen, Germany

References

Cities and towns in Piedmont